Kaori Ito (伊藤郁女)(born 1979) is a Japanese dancer and choreographer who is active in France. She founded the dance company Hime.

Early life and education 
Ito was born in 1979 in Tokyo, Japan. She began studying dance at 5 years old, learning from Syuntoku Takagi (高木俊徳). She studied at Purchase College in the United States, and earned a degree in sociology and education from Rikkyo University in Tokyo. After graduation, Ito received a grant from the Japanese government to study in New York with the Alvin Ailey Dance Theatre.

Career 
Ito began her career by dancing works choreographed by Philippe Decouflé and Angelin Preljocaj. In 2008, she began to choreograph her own works, and created a dance company called Hime in 2014. She was awarded the Chevalier of the Ordre des Arts et des Lettres in 2015.

Some of Ito's best known works include "Plexus", a collaboration with Aurélien Bory in which Ito hung from strings at the Brooklyn Academy of Music; and "I dance because I do not trust words", a duet piece with her father, sculptor Hiroshi Ito.

References

External links 

 Official website

1979 births
Japanese dancers
Contemporary dance choreographers
Contemporary dancers
People from Tokyo

State University of New York at Purchase alumni
Rikkyo University alumni
Living people